OASC may refer to:

Officer and Aircrew Selection Centre, based at RAF Cranwell
Oklahoma Association of Student Councils